The following is a list of the prominent beaches and or tidal swimming areas in the islands of the Azores:

Corvo

 Beach of Portinho da Areia

Faial

 Beach of Alagoa (Conceição) (Praia da Conceicao)
 Beach of Fajã
 Beach of Porto Pim (Praia de Porto Pim, Horta)
 Beach of Praia do Almoxarife (Praia das Cinco Ribeiras, Horta)
 Praia do Norte
 Tidal pools of Feteira (Praia da Feteira)
 Tidal pools of Varadouro (Praia do Varadouro, Horta)

Flores
 Tidal pools of Santa Cruz das Flores (Piscinas naturais de Santa Cruz das Flores)

Graciosa

 Beach of São Mateus (Praia de Sao Mateus)
 Swimming Area of Barro Vermelho (Zona Balnear do Barro Vermelho)
 Swimming Area of Carapacho (Zona Balnear do Carapacho)
 Swimming Area of Santa Cruz (Zona Balnear de Santa Cruz)

Pico

 Praia da Baixa da Ribeirinha
 Praia da Maré
 Praia da Poça das Mujas
 Praia das Poças da Manhenha
 Praia do Canto da Areia
 Prainha do Galeão
 Swimming and Leisure Area of Arinhas (Zona Balnear e de Lazer das Arinhas)
 Tidal pools of Areia Funda
 Tidal pools of Areia Larga (Praia da Areia Larga)
 Tidal pools of Baía das Lajes (Praia da Baia das Lajes)
 Tidal pools of Baía de Canas (Praia da Baia de Canas)
 Tidal pools of 
 Tidal pools of Formosinha
 Tidal pools of Furna de Santo António (Piscinas Naturais da Furna de Santo Antonio)
 Tidal pools of Laje do Vigário (Praia da Laje do Vigario)
 Tidal pools of Poça Branca (Zona de Lazer da Poca Branca)
 Tidal pools of Praia Arcos
 Tidal pools of Praia da Barca
 Tidal pools of Praia do Cabrito

Santa Maria
 

 Beach of Praia Formosa (Praia da Formosa, Vila do Porto) (Praia Formosa)
 Swimming Area of Anjos (Praia dos Anjos, Vila do Porto)
 Swimming Area of Maia (Praia da Maia, Vila do Porto)
 Swimming Area of São Lourenço (Praia de São Lourenço, Vila do Porto)

São Miguel

 Beach of Água de Alto (Praia de Agua de Alto, Vila Franca do Campo)
 Beach of Amora (Praia da Amora)
 Beach of Baixa da Areia (Praia da Baixa da Areia)
 Beach of Corpo Santo (Praia de Corpo Santo, Vila Franca do Campo) (Praia do Corpo Santo)
 Beach of Degredo (Praia do Degredo)
 Beach of Fogo (Beach of Ribeira Quente) (Praia do Fogo, Povoação)
 Beach of Leopoldina (Praia Leopoldina)
 Beach of Lombo Gordo (Praia do Lombo Gordo)
 Beach of Moinhos (Praia dos Moinhos, Ribeira Grande) (Praia Moinhos)
 Beach of Milícias (Praia Grande) (Praia das Milicias, Ponta Delgada) (Praia da Milicias)
 Beach of Mosteiros (Praia dos Mosteiros, Ponta Delgada)
 Beach of Pedreira (Praia da Pedreira)
 Beach of Pópulo (Praía Pequena) (Praia do Populo, Ponta Delgada)
 Beach of Povoação (Praia da Povoação)
 Beach of Rabo de Peixe (Praia do Rabo de Peixe, Ribeira Grande)
 Beach of Santa Bárbara (Praia de Santa Barbara)
 Beach of Vila Franca Islet (Praia do Ilheu de Vila Franca, Vila Franca do Campo)
 Beach of Vinha da Areia (Praia da Vinha da Areia, Vila Franca do Campo)
 Beach of Viola (Praia da Viola)
 Beach Prainha de Água de Alto (Praia da Agua de Alto) (Praia de Agua de Alto)
 Praia da Caloura (Lagoa)
 Praia da Rainha (Vila Franca do Campo)
 Praia de Sao Pedro
 Praia dos Porto de Maio (Ribeira Grande)
 Praia dos Porto Formoso (Ribeira Grande)
 Praia dos Trinta Reis (Vila Franca do Campo)
 Tidal pools of Calhetas (Praia das Calhetas, Ribeira Grande) 
 Tidal pools of Lagoa (Zona Balnear da Lagoa)
 Tidal pools of Ponta da Galera (Caloura)
 Tidal pools of São Roque (Praia de Sao Roque, Ponta Delgada)

São Jorge

 Beach of Velas (Praia das Velas)
 Cais da Faja das Almas
 Cais da Faja do Ouvidor
 Poca Simao Dias
 Swimming Area of Fajã Grande
 Swimming Area of Porto dos Terreiros (Praia do Porto dos Terreiros (Baia))
 Swimming Area of Praia da Preguiça

Terceira

 Alagadouros (Biscoitos)
 Beach of Biscoitos (Praia dos Biscoitos (Baia), Praia da Vitoria)
 Beach of Cinco Ribeiras (Praia das Cinco Ribeiras (Baia), Angra do Heroismo)
 Beach of Escaleiras ((Praia das Escaleiras, Angra do Heroismo/Praia da Vitoria)
 Beach of Fanal (Baia do Fanal) (Fanal (Baia))
 Beach of Mercês (Baia das Merces (Baia))
 Beach of Oficiais (Praia dos Oficiais, Praia da Vitoria)
 Beach of Portas da Prata (Praia das Portas da Prata)
 Beach of Porto Martins (Praia de Porto Martins/Praia do Porto Martins, Angra do Heroismo/Praia da Vitoria)
 Beach of Praia Grande (Praia Grande, Angra do Heroismo / Praia Grande (Praia da Vitoria))
 Beach of Prainha (Angra do Heroísmo) (Angra do Heroismo/Praia da Vitoria)
 Beach of Refugo (Baia do Refugio)
 Beach of Riviera (Praia da Riviera, Praia da Vitoria)
 Beach of Salga (Praia da Salga, Angra do Heroismo)
 Beach of Salgueiros (Praia dos Salgueiros (Baia), Angra do Heroismo)
 Beach of the Sargents (Praia dos Sargentos, Angra do Heroismo/Praia da Vitoria)
 Beach of Villa Maria (Baia de Villa Maria (Baia))
 Cais da Figueirinha
 Poca dos Frades
 Porto da Vila Nova
 Swimming area of Negrito (Praia do Negrito (Baia), Angra do Heroismo)
 Swimming area of Quatro Ribeiras (Praia das Quatro Ribeiras/Zona Balnear das Quatro Ribeiras (Baia), Angra do Heroismo)
 Wharf of Silveira (Praia da Silveira (Baia), Angra do Heroismo)

See also
 List of bays in the Azores
 List of beaches in Portugal

References
 
 
 
 
 

Azores-related lists
Azores
Landforms of the Azores
Azores
Beaches, Azores
Beaches